Watford Football Club are an English association football club, based in Watford, Hertfordshire. As of 2022, the team competes in the EFL Championship, the second-highest level of the English football league system.

Three managers – Len Goulden, Neil McBain, and Quique Sánchez Flores – have taken charge of the club on two occasions, while Graham Taylor had three stints as manager of the club.

Managers
Correct

Playing records

Fourteen Watford managers played for Watford before or whilst managing them.

References
General

Specific

Managers
 
Watford